Baker is an unincorporated community in Benson County, North Dakota, United States.

References

Unincorporated communities in North Dakota
Unincorporated communities in Benson County, North Dakota